DNY may refer to:

 Diocese of New York (disambiguation)
 DNY callsign
 KDNY-LP
 WDNY (disambiguation)
 Deni language (ISO 639 code: dny)
 The Denali Fund Inc. (stock ticker DNY); see Companies listed on the New York Stock Exchange (D)
 Danby railway station (station code DNY), Esk Valley Line, Danby, North Yorkshire, England, UK
 Danish Navy (ICAO airline code DNY), see List of airline codes (D)
 Diploma In Naturopathy & Yoga (DNY), at Sunrise University

See also